This is a list of the Mayors of Red Deer, Alberta. In all countries of the Commonwealth, mayors are awarded the title of His/Her Worship. Currently, elections for the office of mayor take place every four years on the third Monday in October, the next occurring in 2017.

Mayors of the Town of Red Deer (1901–1913)
 1901–1903 Raymond Leonard Gaetz
 1903–1904 The Rev. George A. Love
 1904–1906 Edward Michener
 1906–1908 Halley H. Gaetz
 1908–1909 William J. Botterill
 1909–1910 Samuel E. McKee
 1910–1912 Robert B. Welliver
 1912–1913 Francis Wright Galbraith

Mayors of the City of Red Deer
 1913 Francis Wright Galbraith
 1913–1914 Stanley N. Carscallen
 1914–1916 John A. Carswell
 1916–1918 George Smith
 1918–1920 William E. Lord
 1920–1924 Dr. John Collison
 1924–1927 Edgar G. Johns
 1927–1930 Dr. Harold J. Snell
 1930–1932 Fred Turnbull
 1932–1936 W. Peter Code
 1936–1944 Edward S. Hogg
 1944–1947 Harvey W. Halladay
 1947–1949 Dr. Charles R. Bunn
 1949–1951 John V. Bettenson
 1951–1953 Paul Crawford
 1953–1955 Harvey W. Halladay
 1955–1961 Jack M. McAfee
 1961–1965 Ernest Newman (resigned from office)
 1965 F.B. Moore (pro tempore)
 1965–1974 R. E. Barrett
 1974–1977 Roy McGregor
 1977–1980 Ken Curle
 1980–1992 Robert J. McGhee
 1992–2004 Gail Surkan
 2004–2013 Morris Flewwelling
 2013–2021 Tara Veer
2021–present Ken Johnston

Red Deer, Alberta